Sir Hugh Fraser, 2nd Baronet (18 December 1936 – 5 May 1987), formerly 2nd Baron Fraser of Allander, was chairman of the House of Fraser, Harrods, George Outram and Company, and Whyte and Mackay. He lived at Mugdock, near Milngavie, Scotland. He was the son of Hugh Fraser, 1st Baron Fraser of Allander, and inherited the Barony of Fraser of Allander on his father's death in 1966, but disclaimed it for life the same year. He has three daughters: Patricia, Belinda and Caroline. He was not related to the politician Sir Hugh Fraser.

Career
Fraser was educated at St. Mary's School, Melrose and Kelvinside Academy.  He was given an honorary doctorate by the University of Stirling, where one of the student residences is now named Fraser of Allander after him. In 1981, he gifted the Mugdock Castle estate (purchased by his father) to the regional council as a country park. In 1960, he established the Hugh Fraser Foundation for charitable work. He was also a major benefactor to the Glasgow Scout Association and was chairman of Dumbarton Football Club.

It was alleged by a Channel 5 documentary that Fraser put up the money for an attempted abduction of Ronnie Biggs from Brazil, so the latter could stand trial in Britain for his part in the Great Train Robbery.

Sir Hugh Fraser died from cancer in 1987, aged 50.

References

Fraser, Hugh
Fraser, Hugh
People educated at St. Mary's School, Melrose
People educated at Kelvinside Academy
Fraser, Hugh
Fraser, Hugh
Hugh Fraser, 2nd Baronet
Fraser, Hugh, 2nd
Fraser, Hugh
20th-century Scottish businesspeople
20th-century British philanthropists
Chairmen and investors of football clubs in Scotland
People from Bearsden
Dumbarton F.C.